The 2016 Nottingham Open (known for sponsorship reasons as the Aegon Open Nottingham) was a combined men's and women's tennis tournament played on outdoor grass courts. It will be the 9th edition of the event for the women and the 21st edition for the men. It is classified as a WTA International tournament on the 2016 WTA Tour and as an ATP World Tour 250 series tournament on the 2016 ATP World Tour. The event will take place at the Nottingham Tennis Centre in Nottingham, United Kingdom from 6 June through 12 June 2016 for the women, and from 20 June through 25 June 2016 for the men.

ATP singles main-draw entrants

Seeds

 1 Rankings are as of 13 June 2016.

Other entrants
The following players received wildcards into the main draw:
 Liam Broady
 Brydan Klein
 Alexander Ward
 James Ward

The following player received entry using a protected ranking:
 Julien Benneteau

The following players received entry from the qualifying draw:
 Frank Dancevic
 Ernesto Escobedo
 Jan Hernych
 Stéphane Robert

Withdrawals
Before the tournament
 Iñigo Cervantes →replaced by  Evgeny Donskoy 
 Federico Delbonis →replaced by  Kyle Edmund
 Marcel Granollers →replaced by  Víctor Estrella Burgos
 Illya Marchenko →replaced by Daniel Evans
 Paul-Henri Mathieu →replaced by  Mikhail Kukushkin
 Leonardo Mayer →replaced by  Jordan Thompson

ATP doubles main-draw entrants

Seeds

1 Rankings are as of 13 June 2016.

Other entrants
The following pairs received wildcards into the doubles main draw:
  Jonathan Marray /  Adil Shamasdin
  Ken Skupski /  Neal Skupski

WTA singles main-draw entrants

Seeds

 1 Rankings are as of 23 May 2016.

Other entrants
The following players received wildcards into the main draw:
 Freya Christie
 Karolína Plíšková
 Laura Robson

The following players received entry using a protected ranking:
 Victoria Duval
 Peng Shuai

The following players received entry from the qualifying draw:
 Ashleigh Barty
 Michelle Larcher de Brito
 Tara Moore
 Zhang Kailin

The following players received entry as lucky losers:
  Andrea Hlaváčková
  Tamira Paszek

Withdrawals
Before the tournament
  Victoria Azarenka → replaced by  Anna Tatishvili
  Petra Cetkovská → replaced by  Lauren Davis
  Irina Falconi → replaced by  Alison Riske
  Madison Keys → replaced by  Victoria Duval
  Ana Konjuh → replaced by  Andrea Hlaváčková
  Monica Niculescu → replaced by  Tamira Paszek
  Lesia Tsurenko → replaced by  Magda Linette

Retirements
  Magdaléna Rybáriková

WTA doubles main-draw entrants

Seeds

1 Rankings are as of 23 May 2016.

Other entrants
The following pair received a wildcard into the doubles main draw:
  Freya Christie /  Laura Robson

Withdrawals
During the tournament
  Karolína Plíšková

Champions

Men's singles

  Steve Johnson def.  Pablo Cuevas, 7–6(7–5), 7–5

Women's singles

  Karolína Plíšková def.  Alison Riske, 7–6(10–8), 7–5

Men's doubles

  Dominic Inglot /  Daniel Nestor def.   Ivan Dodig /  Marcelo Melo, 7–5, 7–6(7–4)

Women's doubles

  Andrea Hlaváčková /  Peng Shuai def.  Gabriela Dabrowski /  Yang Zhaoxuan, 7–5, 3–6, [10–7]

References

External links
 Website

2016 WTA Tour
2016 ATP World Tour
2016
2016 in English tennis
June 2016 sports events in the United Kingdom